Declassified: Untold Stories of American Spies is a documentary series that details important cases, missions and operations of the American intelligence community, told firsthand by the men and women who worked them.

Producers collaborate with prominent intelligence, military and government agencies such as CIA, FBI, NSA, DIA, DOD, Homeland Security, The State Department, et al., to tell their stories in a non-political, objective way that spotlights the perspective of people that do the work.

The series  debuted on CNN on June 19, 2016. Season 2 premiered on July 22, 2017. Season 3 premiered on September 29, 2019.

Episodes

Series overview

Season 1 (2016)

Season 2 (2017)

Season 3 (2019)

References 

2010s American documentary television series
American crime television series
CNN original programming
Television series featuring reenactments